Rhopalomelus is a genus of beetles in the family Carabidae, containing the following species:

 Rhopalomelus angusticollis Boheman, 1848
 Rhopalomelus bennigseni Alluaud, 1935
 Rhopalomelus ingens Alluaud, 1930
 Rhopalomelus stenoderus Alluaud, 1930

References

Licininae